is a Japanese light novel series written by Ren Eguchi. The series originated on the Shōsetsuka ni Narō website in January 2016, before being published in print with illustrations by Masa by Overlap beginning in November 2016 under their Overlap Novels imprint. As of December 2022, thirteen volumes have been released.

A manga adaptation, illustrated by Akagishi K, began serialization on the Comic Gardo website in March 2017. As of December 2022, the manga's individual chapters have been collected into nine volumes. A manga spin-off, illustrated by Momo Futaba, began serialization on the same website in August 2018. As of December 2022, the spin-off's individual chapters have been collected into seven volumes. An anime television series adaptation by MAPPA premiered in January 2023.

Plot
A group of four Japanese people, consisting of three high school students and one adult, are magically summoned to a parallel fantasy world by the Kingdom of Reijseger, who asks them for help in their war against the demonfolk. As a result of the summoning ritual, the three students appear to have several powerful magical abilities and are accepted as "Heroes". However, the adult, an ordinary salaryman named Tsuyoshi Mukouda (a.k.a. "Mukohda"), is found to only have the power of "Online Supermarket". Suspicious of the kingdom's true intentions, he convinces the nobles his ability is useless, allowing him to leave and pursue a simple life in the new world. Experimenting with his Online Supermarket skill, he discovers he is able to instantly order food and other products from Japan. During his travels, he meets a legendary beast known as a "Fenrir", who demands Mukohda feed him a meal. After numerous servings, the Fenrir, eventually named Fel, takes a liking to Mukohda's cooking and forces him to accept a familiar contract. As Mukohda continues his journey, he encounters other monsters, as well as gods from the Divine Realm, who grant him familiar contracts and blessings in order to obtain his food and otherworldly goods.

Characters

Main characters
 / 

The main protagonist of the series. He is a mild-mannered but cowardly 27-year-old salaryman and proficient cook who is accidentally transported to another world during a hero summoning ritual. Tsuyoshi presents himself as "Mukohda" in the new world after learning full names are used exclusively by nobility. He has the unique ability "Online Supermarket", which allows him to purchase items from modern Japan. He is able to provide temporary stat buffs by cooking meals with ingredients bought through his skill. He gains notoriety as a beast tamer through his powerful familiar contracts.

A Fenrir and Mukohda's first familiar. He is a legendary wolf-like creature who has lived for over a thousand years. He has extraordinary strength, agility, and magic enables him to wipe out most monsters with little effort. Fel is prideful, selfish, and gluttonous, choosing to follow Mukohda simply to eat his food. He loves meat and hates vegetables.

A slime and Mukohda's second familiar. Initially met as a baby, Sui evolves throughout the series by gaining experience through battle and eating trash from Mukohda's Online Supermarket purchases. Though slimes are generally regarded as weak, Sui is noted for being a special exception. It is able to melt enemies with acid bullets, as well as create potions and weapons. Sporting a child-like personality, it enjoys desserts and dislikes spicy foods. Sui is the main protagonist of the spin-off manga series Campfire Cooking in Another World with My Absurd Skill: Sui's Great Adventure.

 (drama CD)
A pixie dragon and Mukohda's third familiar. He is very small, but has a spunky and boastful nature. He is able to fly at extreme speeds and holds a vast amount of magical power. Despite being an adult dragon, he was named with the honorific -chan by Mukohda due to his size and cuteness, much to Dora's chagrin. His favorite treat is Japanese pudding.

An ancient dragon and Mukohda's fourth and temporary familiar. Having lived for several millennia, he is an old rival of Fel and one of few creatures capable of fighting him on equal terms. Gon is similar to Fel in voraciousness, arrogance, and stubbornness, causing the two to butt heads. Much like Dora-chan, he was given his embarrassing name by Mukohda, who based it solely on his age. He normally stands about twenty stories tall, but is able to shrink at will.

Deities

The Goddess of Wind and progenitor of the Fenrirs, who has long silver-colored hair and a huge sweet tooth. She is the first deity to grant Mukohda her blessing, giving him immunity to poisons, illnesses, and other negative status effects. Due to her constant demands for otherworldly sweets and frequent emotional outbursts, Mukohda refers to her as the "divine disappointment".

The Goddess of Fire, who has long red-colored hair, dark skin, and a hotheaded temperament. She strengthens Mukohda's fire magic in exchange for otherworldly beer.

The Goddess of Earth, who has long blonde hair, a curvaceous figure, and a sisterly personality. She bolsters Mukohda's earth magic in exchange for otherworldly beauty products.

The Goddess of Water, who has shorter blue-colored hair, a young appearance, and a quiet demeanor. Due to Mukohda's lack of affinity for water magic, she grants Sui her blessing instead to receive offerings of otherworldly food.

The God of War, who wears a skull helmet and is adorned with tattoos. In exchange for otherworldly booze, he provides Fel and Dora-chan with his blessing, boosting their stats by 50% during battle.

The God of Blacksmithing, who has dwarf-like features. In exchange for otherworldly booze, he gives Sui the ability to forge and upgrade weapons. 

The God of All Creation, the creator deity of the world Mukohda is summoned to. He eventually catches the other gods extorting Mukohda for his otherworldly goods, sentencing them to temporary house arrest. After Mukohda sends him sake as a gift, Demiurge bestows his blessing of longevity, raising Mukhoda's lifespan to 1,500 years.

Other characters

The elven guildmaster for the Adventurer's Guild in the dungeon city of Dolan. He is a former S-ranked adventurer, expert swordsman, and skilled monster butcher. He is infamously known for his eccentric behavior and obsession with dragons. Elrand first meets Mukohda and his party after they seek his help in butchering a rare earth dragon for its meat. He often attempts to follow Mukohda around after learning about his exploits of defeating and recruiting dragons.

A leather goods merchant from the city of Karelina whom Mukohda befriends after saving his caravan from a bandit attack. The two form a successful business partnership, alongside Lambert's wife Marie, selling soap and hair treatment products from Mukohda's world. When Mukohda decides to make Karelina his base of operations and buy a house, Lambert offers him real estate advice and recommendations on purchasing servants.

Media

Light novel
Written by Ren Eguchi, the series began publication on the novel posting website Shōsetsuka ni Narō on January 5, 2016. The series was later acquired by Overlap, who began publishing the series with illustrations by Masa on November 25, 2016 under their Overlap Novels imprint. As of December 2022, thirteen volumes have been released.

In March 2019, J-Novel Club announced that they licensed the light novel for English publication.

Volume list

Manga
A manga adaptation, illustrated by Akagishi K, began serialization on the Comic Gardo manga website on March 24, 2017. As of December 2022, the series' individual chapters have been collected into nine tankōbon volumes. In April 2020, J-Novel Club announced that they also licensed the manga adaptation for English publication.

A spin-off manga illustrated by Momo Futaba, titled , began serialization on the Comic Gardo website on August 24, 2018. As of December 2022, the series' individual chapters have been collected into seven tankōbon volumes. In September 2022, J-Novel Club announced that they also licensed the spin-off manga in English.

Volume list

Main series

Spin-off

Anime
An anime television series adaptation was announced on October 29, 2022. It is produced by MAPPA and directed by Kiyoshi Matsuda, with scripts written by Michiko Yokote, character designs handled by Nao Ōtsu, and music composed by Masato Kōda, Kana Utatane, and Kuricorder Quartet. The series premiered on January 11, 2023, on TV Tokyo and other networks. Muse Communication licensed the series in South and Southeast Asiawhile Crunchyroll has licensed the series for the rest of the world.

Episode list

Reception
In 2018, the manga adaptation was ranked as the second best Isekai manga by Japanese bookstore employees.

The anime, meanwhile, received positive reviews from the fans, both old and new. MyAnimeList rates the anime at 7.86 out of 10, while IMDb rated the anime at 7.3 out of 10. Meanwhile, users of Anime Planet ranked the series 4-stars out of 5.

See also
Sabikui Bisco - A light novel series also illustrated by K Akagishi
An Archdemon's Dilemma: How to Love Your Elf Bride - The spin-off manga series of which is illustrated by Momo Futaba

Notes

References

Further reading

External links
  
  
  
  
 

2016 Japanese novels
2023 anime television series debuts
Anime and manga based on light novels
Comedy anime and manga
Cooking in anime and manga
Crunchyroll anime
Isekai anime and manga
Isekai novels and light novels
J-Novel Club books
Japanese webcomics
Light novels
Light novels first published online
MAPPA
Shōnen manga
Shōsetsuka ni Narō
TV Tokyo original programming
Webcomics in print